Kasimov (Ханкирмән, historically Gorodets Meshchyorsky, Novy Nizovoy) is a town in Ryazan Oblast, Russia, located on the left bank of the Oka River. Population:    17,000 (1910).

History
The first population of this area was a Finnic tribe called the Meshchyora, later assimilated by Russians and Tatars. The town was founded in 1152 by the Vladimir-Suzdal ruler Yuri Dolgorukiy as Grodets, then Gorodets Meschyorsky. It was included in the Mishar Yurt division of the Golden Horde, but then was sold to Muscovy.

In 1376, the town was destroyed by the Mongol, but was soon rebuilt as Novy Nizovoy. After the Battle of Suzdal in 1445 (in which Grand Duke Vasily II was taken prisoner), the Meschyora lands were given to Oluğ Möxämmäd, Khan of Kazan Khanate as a ransom for the sovereign's life.

In 1452, Great Duke Vasily II of the Grand Duchy of Moscow gave this town to Kazan prince Qasim Khan, who served as tribute inspector of the Great Horde, but then came to Russian service. By other accounts, Qasim and his brother Yosif fled from Kazan after losing their bid for the throne against their brother Mäxmüd. After 1471, the town was known as Qasím city. It remained the capital of Qasim Khanate until 1681 when the khanate was re-absorbed into Russia.

A group of Tatars settled there in 15th century and are now known as Qasim Tatars. They speak the Mishar dialect, mixed with the Middle Tatar dialect of the Tatar language. In the 19th century, it became known for its waiters, who staffed many of the St Petersburg hotels.

Administrative and municipal status
Within the framework of administrative divisions, Kasimov serves as the administrative center of Kasimovsky District, even though it is not a part of it. As an administrative division, it is incorporated separately as the town of oblast significance of Kasimov—an administrative unit with the status equal to that of the districts. As a municipal division, the town of oblast significance of Kasimov is incorporated as Kasimov Urban Okrug.

Layout and landmarks

In the 17th century, the town was separated into three parts:
Old Town (Russian: Старый Посад; Tatar: İske Bistä) and Tatar Town (Russian: Татарская слобода; Tatar: Tatar Bistäse) regulated by khan of Qasim Khanate and Tatar noblemen;
Yamskoy Town (Russian: Ямская слобода) of Russian commoners, regulated by Moscow;
Marfin Town (Russian: Марфина слобода, Tatar: Marfin Bistäse) – part of the city, regulated by Kasimov voyevodas.

Historical buildings:
Khan's Mosque (with a limestone minaret from either 1467 or the 1550s)
Mausoleum of Shahghali (Şahğäli) Khan (1555)
Mausoleum of Afghan Moxammad (Äfğan Möxämmäd) Khan (1658)
Russian Orthodox churches:
Church of the Epiphany 17th century;
St. Nicholas Church 17th century;
Trinity Church 17th century;
Cathedral of the Ascension 19th century.

References

Notes

Sources

This article incorporates text from the Brockhaus-Efron Encyclopedia

External links

Official website of Kasimov 
Kasimov Business Directory  

Cities and towns in Ryazan Oblast
Kasimovsky Uyezd
Golden Ring of Russia
1152 establishments in Europe
12th-century establishments in Russia